HMS Dundee was a  Shoreham-class sloop of the British Royal Navy. The ship was built at Chatham Dockyard, entering service in 1933.

The ship saw service primarily as a convoy escort in the Atlantic. She was sunk by a German submarine while escorting one of these convoys in September 1940.

Construction and design
The British Admiralty ordered four sloops as part of the 1930 construction programme, with three ordered from Devonport and one from Chatham dockyard. They were intended for a dual role of patrol service in overseas stations in peacetime and minesweeping during war.

Two Admiralty 3-drum water-tube boilers fed two geared steam turbines which drove two propeller shafts.

The ship's main gun armament consisted of two 4-inch (102 mm) QF Mk V guns mounted fore-and-aft on the ship's centreline, with the forward gun on a High-Angle (HA) anti-aircraft mounting and the aft gun on a Low-Angle (LA) mounting, suitable only for use against surface targets. Four 3-pounder saluting guns completed the ship's gun armament. The initial anti-submarine armament consisted of four depth charges. The ship had a crew of 100 officers and other ranks.

Dundee was  laid down at Chatham Dockyard on 11 December 1931. She was launched on 20 September 1932 and completed on 31 March 1933, with the pennant number L84.

Service history
Following commissioning, Dundee was assigned to the America and West Indies Station, replacing the old sloop . On 11 June 1936, she attempted to salvage the cargo ship , which had run aground off the coast of Brazil on 1 June. In October 1935 she recommissioned at Portsmouth before rejoining the America and West Indies Station at Bermuda.

Dundee served as an escort for convoys during the Battle of the Atlantic. She was sunk at 00.25 hours on 15 September 1940 by the most successful German submarine of the war, commanded at that time by Kapitänleutnant Heinrich Bleichrodt.

U-48 attacked a convoy, SC 3, of which Dundee was the only escort. U-48 missed the British merchant ship Empire Soldier, but later torpedoed and sank Dundee, commanded by Capt. O.M.F. Stokes, RN, in position 56º45'N, 14º14'W, off Northern Ireland.

The Imperial War Museum has a recording from its sound archives of W J H Mills, a Canadian serving with the Royal Navy on Dundee, describing the sinking. In the recording he recounts "The blast was so severe that it tore the lockers away from the bulkhead mess – we knew we'd been hit – there was no mistaking it."

References

Notes

Citations

Bibliography

External links
Uboat.net on HMS Dundee (L84)
An image of HMS Dundee
An image of HMS Bridgewater, a ship of the same or a similar class as HMS Dundee
Ports visited by HMS Dundee from April 1933 to October 1935 – Recorded by Chief Petty Officer Joseph Henry Bubb

Shoreham-class sloops
Sloops of the Royal Navy
World War II shipwrecks in the Atlantic Ocean
Maritime incidents in September 1940
Ships sunk by German submarines in World War II
1932 ships
Ships built in Chatham